Bates-Englehardt Mansion, also known as St. Johnsville Community House, is a historic home located at St. Johnsville in Montgomery County, New York, United States. It was built in 1869 as a three-story Italianate style mansion.  It has a 35 feet by 40 feet main block with a two-story kitchen wing in the rear.  A brick solarium was added in 1916 and enlarged and converted to an auditorium in 1934. The original Italianate style flat roof with cupola was replaced in 1916 with a Georgian style roof.  The front entrance features a Colonial Revival style porch added in 1909.

It was added to the National Register of Historic Places in 1989.

References

Houses on the National Register of Historic Places in New York (state)
Colonial Revival architecture in New York (state)
Italianate architecture in New York (state)
Houses completed in 1869
Houses in Montgomery County, New York
1869 establishments in New York (state)
National Register of Historic Places in Montgomery County, New York